The Bible has been translated into many of the languages of China besides Chinese. These include major minority languages with their own literary history, including Korean, Mongolian, Tibetan, Kazakh, Kyrgyz, Russian and Uyghur. The other languages of China are mainly tribal languages, mainly spoken in Yunnan in Southwest China.

Chinese

Jingpho/Kachin
The Bible was first translated into the Kachin language in Burma in 1927, by a Swedish Baptist missionary, Ola Hanson. Amity Press published the Jingpho Bible in 1989 and again in 2013.

Lahu
The complete Bible was first published in Lahu in 1989.

Lisu
Lisu is part of the Tibeto-Burman family. Samuel Pollard and James O. Fraser prepared simple Christian literature while they were in the first stages of learning the Miao and Lisu languages, later moving on to translating the New Testament. 

In the Central Lisu dialect, Fraser, after creating the Fraser alphabet, first worked on Mark and John. He then handed on the translation task to Allyn Cooke and his wife, Leila, coming back to help the team with revision in the mid 1930s. Isobel Miller Kuhn also worked on the translation. The New Testament was finished in 1938, and the complete Bible in 1968.

Eastern Lisu/Lipo
The New Testament in Eastern Lisu, translated by George E. Metcalf, was first published in 1951 in Hong Kong, however no copies ever got back to Yunnan. The Old Testament in Eastern Lisu is not yet fully translated.

Miao
Sam Pollard began work translating the New Testament into the Large Flowery Miao language of northeastern Yunnan in 1906, publishing parts of it, however died of typhoid in 1917 before he could finish it. Colleagues completed the work. The book was typeset in Japan, and eventually 85,000 copies were distributed.

In the late 1980s, Miao Christian leaders decided to finish Pollard's work and translate the Old Testament. After discussion with the Yunnan Christian Council and the Three-Self Patriotic Movement, semi-official organizations, a translation team was formed in Kunming. One question was whether to continue to use the Pollard script, which was familiar to Christians from their reading of older materials, or to use the new script promulgated by the government in 1956. In the end, a modified version of the old script was used. When Pollard's Miao characters were not yet included in Unicode, standard computer word processing programs could not handle the text. Consultants from among the missionaries created keyboard shortcuts, but their unique characters could not be copied or the text checked. The Pollard script has since been added to Unicode released in version 6.1. The new translation was launched at a ceremony in Kunming in September 2009, with an initial printing of 10,000 copies.

Naxi
The Gospel of Mark was translated into Naxi, spoken in Yunnan, by Elise Schapten using the Pollard script and published by the British and Foreign Bible Society in 1932.

Wa
The New Testament in Wa was translated by Vincent Young and published in 1938 by the British and Foreign Bible Society. The entire Bible was completed by Wa Christians in the nineties, and a trial version was published. Since the trial version, the Bible Society of Myanmar has been worked on a thorough revision of the text, and a finalized Wa Bible was published in April 2012. Amity Press has published the New Testament in Wa, available on YouVersion.

Xishuangbanna Dai
The Bible was first translated into Xishuangbanna Dai in 1933.

Yi
Amity Press has published the New Testament in Yi.

See also
Bible translations into Chinese
Bible translations into Manchu
Bible translations into Korean
Bible translations into Mongolian
Bible translations into Tibetan
Bible translations into Uyghur

References

Further reading
 Cheung, Siu-woo. “Millenarianism, Christian Movement, and Ethnic Change Among the Miao in Southwestern China,” in Cultural Encounters On China’s Ethnic Frontiers. Edited by Stevan Harrell, 217-247. Seattle: University of Washington Press, 1995.
 Covell, Ralph R. The Liberating Gospel in China: The Christian Faith among China's Minority Peoples. Grand Rapids, MI: Baker Books, 1995.
 Han, Junxue  韩军学. Jidu Jiao Yu Yunnan Shao Shu Min Tsu 基督敎与云南少数民族 (Christianity and Ethnic Minorities in Yunnan). Kunming: Yunnan Renmin Chuban she, 2000.
 John R. Hykes. List of Translations of the Scriptures into the Chinese Language. (Yokohama, Japan: Fukuin Printing, 1915).

China
Languages of China